The Salleron is a  long river in the Haute-Vienne, Vienne and Indre departments in central France. Its source is several small streams which converge in a pond at Azat-le-Ris. It flows generally north. It is a left tributary of the Anglin, into which it flows between Concremiers and Ingrandes.

Departments and communes along its course
This list is ordered from source to mouth: 
Haute-Vienne: Azat-le-Ris
Vienne: Lathus-Saint-Rémy, Bourg-Archambault, Saint-Léomer, Journet, Béthines, Haims
Indre: Concremiers, Ingrandes

References

Rivers of France
Rivers of Indre
Rivers of Haute-Vienne
Rivers of Vienne
Rivers of Centre-Val de Loire
Rivers of Nouvelle-Aquitaine